KKOZ may refer to:

 KKOZ (AM), a radio station (1430 AM) licensed to Ava, Missouri, United States
 KKOZ-FM, a radio station (92.1 FM) licensed to Ava, Missouri, United States